Golubovac Divuški is a village in Croatia. It is connected by the D47 highway.

References

Populated places in Sisak-Moslavina County